The Providence Sand is a geologic formation in Georgia. It preserves fossils dating back to the Cretaceous period.

See also

 List of fossiliferous stratigraphic units in Georgia (U.S. state)
 Paleontology in Georgia (U.S. state)

References
 

Cretaceous Georgia (U.S. state)
Cretaceous Alabama